Paraisobuthus is an extinct genus of scorpions from the Upper Carboniferous of Europe and North America.

Species
 Paraisobuthus duobicarinatus Kjellesvig-Waering, 1986
 Paraisobuthus frici Kjellesvig-Waering, 1986
 Paraisobuthus prantli Kjellesvig-Waering, 1986
 Paraisobuthus virginiae Kjellesvig-Waering, 1986

References

Scorpion genera
Prehistoric scorpions
Carboniferous arthropods of Europe
Carboniferous arthropods of North America